Acha of Deira was a princess of Deira, and the daughter of Ælla of Deira.

She married Æthelfrith, king of Bernicia. He may have married her prior to taking power in Deira, in which case the marriage may have facilitated it, or he may have done so afterwards in order to consolidate his position there. They had eight children:
 Eanfrith of Bernicia (590–634 CE)
 Oswald of Northumbria (c. 604 – 5 August 642 CE)
 Oswiu of Northumbria (c. 612 – 15 February 670 CE)
 Oswudu of Northumbria
 Oslac of Northumbria
 Oslaf of Northumbria
 Offa of Northumbria
 Æbba of Northumbria

References

6th-century births
7th-century deaths
English princesses
6th-century English people
7th-century English people
6th-century English women
7th-century English women